Theodore Joseph Odenwald (January 4, 1902 – October 23, 1965) was a Major League Baseball pitcher who played for two seasons. He played for the Cleveland Indians for ten games during the 1921 Cleveland Indians season and one game during the 1922 Cleveland Indians season.

External links

1902 births
1965 deaths
Cleveland Indians players
Major League Baseball pitchers
Baseball players from Wisconsin
People from Hudson, Wisconsin
Albany Senators players
Columbus Senators players
Denver Bears players
Des Moines Boosters players
Hartford Senators players
Omaha Buffaloes players